The 2006 Lexmark Indy 300 was the thirteenth and penultimate round of the 2006 Bridgestone Presents the Champ Car World Series Powered by Ford season, held on 21 October 2006 on the Surfers Paradise Street Circuit in Queensland, Australia.  The pole was won by native Queenslander Will Power, the first of his Champ Car career. The race was won by Nelson Philippe, the first and only win of his Champ Car career. By virtue of his eighth-place finish, Sébastien Bourdais clinched his third consecutive Champ Car season title, the first man to achieve this feat since Ted Horn won three consecutive National Championships from 1946 through 1948.

Qualifying results

* Justin Wilson fractured the scaphoid bone in his wrist in a crash during practice on Friday and took no further part in the event as a result.

Race

Caution flags

Notes

 New Race Record Nelson Philippe 1:50:50.985
 Average Speed 89.259 mph

Championship standings after the race

 Bold indicates the Season Champion.
Drivers' Championship standings

 Note: Only the top five positions are included.

External links
 Friday Qualification Times 
 Saturday Qualification Times 
 Race Results
 Bourdais secures third straight championship 
 Weather information

Lexmark Indy 300
Lexmark Indy 300
Gold Coast Indy 300